{{DISPLAYTITLE:C18H18}}
The molecular formula C18H18 (molar mass: 234.33 g/mol, exact mass: 234.1409 u) may refer to:

 Cyclooctadecanonaene, or [18]annulene
 Retene

Molecular formulas